Yameogo is a surname. Notable people with the surname include:

Hermann Yaméogo (born 1948), Burkinabé politician
Herve Yaméogo (born 1982), Burkinabé basketball player
Narcisse Yaméogo (born 1990), Burkinabé footballer
Blaise Yaméogo (born 1993), Burkinabé footballer
Maurice Yaméogo (1921-1993), first President of Upper Volta (Burkina Faso)
Salvador Yaméogo, Burkinabé politician
S. Pierre Yameogo (1955-2019), Burkinabé film director